EMMS International is a non-denominational christian Non-governmental Organization (NGO) that provides medical aid to countries around the world and operates field offices in the UK, Malawi, India, Israel, and Nepal. Founded to provide clinical education to missionaries and medical aid to people in need in Scotland, it later expanded to the Middle East, South Asia, and Africa through sponsoring the construction of dispensaries and hospitals. Its educational mission expanded from training missionary physicians in Edinburgh to training local nurses and physicians in the countries where it works. EMMS continues to provide resource assistance at all its sites. Based in Scotland, its vision is "health for today, hope for tomorrow."

Introduction
In 1841, The Edinburgh Medical Missionary Society International (EMMS) was founded as the Edinburgh Association for Sending Medical Aid to Foreign Countries. In 1843, it was renamed as The Edinburgh Medical Missionary Society. During the 19th century it provided supplies to missionaries like Dr James Johnston who set out from Jamaica with six Afro-Caribbeans to investigate the "Dark Continent". Johnston wrote an account of his travels comparing the romance created by missionaries and organisations seeking funding and the realities of visiting Africa.

In 2002, the organization split into two charities: the EMMS International and EMMS Nazareth which operates under the name of The Nazareth Trust. The Nazareth Trust owns and runs  The Nazareth Hospital founded by EMMS missionary Kaloost Vartan. In 2010, the EMMS International supported 35 hospitals, clinics, and health projects. It specializes in the funding of construction of facilities, new equipment, staff training, and community health initiatives. In Malawi, it supports eight projects, including four hospitals, one college of nursing, one maternity unit, and two clinics.  In 2011, the overall income of the organization was £818,394 and the expenditures were £945,327.

The values that EMMS International seeks to express are faithfulness, empowerment, encouragement, and accountability. Its core values are derived from the Presbyterian Christian faith. The members of the organization are acting as a response to their religious belief in Jesus Christ and God. Through prayer and donations, the organization declares that it strives to help and serve others.  This Christian calling is found in the posting of news items and blog posts on the EMMS International website that begin with phrases such as "Praise God" and "Pray."

Christian values
EMMS International's Christian values are faithfulness, empowerment, encouragement, and accountability. It seeks to spread Christianity through medical missions to those in need and works with Christian organizations overseas in India, Nepal, and Malawi. However, it does not provide Christian literature to its overseas partners. In order to follow Christianity and keep Jesus Christ in focus, the EMMS asks for constant prayer for guidance and protection.  EMMS International states that "the importance of prayer to a missionary organization should never be under-estimated." EMMS International suggests that members and people concerned with the success of the organisation pray on a daily basis.  There is an official EMMS International prayer that asks for a continued focus on Jesus Christ and the light that He is to the world.   The EMMS staff has weekly Bible meetings in which staff members read the Bible, pray, and meditate on the Bible.
	
Three times per year, EMMS International publishes a new schedule of prayers in a unique prayer booklet. This Prayer Focus booklet, gives weekly prayer suggestions or guidance for people who wish to pray for the organization.  The reader is asked to pray for the various staff, organization, and the relief of ailments.  For example, in the September–November 2012 booklet, a person is asked to pray during the week commencing 5 November for "the Lord to send the project Christian nurses and doctors who want to love and care for people with HIV and are willing to commit to serve with Jeevan Sahara Kendra."

Educational funding
EMMS international provides grants for individual student's electives overseas.  Students can be in the medical, dental, nursing, or therapy fields.  Although these students do not have to be religiously affiliated, they are required to spend their elective time at a Christian mission hospital.  Eligibility for the grants requires that students currently be enrolled in a university or college in Scotland, Northern Ireland or a Third World country.  The EMMS provides on average £200-300 for this grant.  Therefore, it is meant to serve as a supplement rather than as a scholarship.

The EMMS provides funding for staff training in its sponsored sites, but does not dictate exactly what must be taught. It leaves the contents and direction of the training up to the site. In this way, the site can utilize its local knowledge to focus its training on what is necessary for it to grow in its work.  Thus, the EMMS works to help both the brick-and-mortar construction of sites and the expertise of their workers.

Scottish origins
The origin of the EMMS can be traced to an American missionary, Dr. Peter Parker, who gave a lecture in Edinburgh that was attended by the EMMS founders.  In his lecture, Parker discussed his role as the first missionary doctor to China commissioned by the American Board of Commissioners for Foreign Missions and described his involvement in the founding of the Medical Missionary Society of China in 1832.  Inspired by Parker's lecture, the EMMS was founded on 30 November 1841.   Its founders included Dr. John Abercombie who became the first president of the EMMS. The EMMS laid out two primary objectives. One objective was to train physicians to become medical missionaries.  The second objective was to change the churches’ view about medical missionaries and to convince them that these missions were crucial to their work serving God.

To meet these goals, the EMMS pursued several different approaches to medical missions in the UK as it developed. From 1841 to 1851, the EMMS largely funded special lectures on the topic of medical missionaries and how to serve people in need.  The EMMS recorded these lectures and published them for wide consumption.   The organization also awarded prizes for the best-written essays on medical subjects.  In 1851, the EMMS began giving pecuniary amounts of aid to students studying medicine at the University of Edinburgh. One of the founding directors of the EMMS, Dr. Peter David Handyside FRSE, established a medical mission dispensary to serve the Irish residing in Edinburgh upon the urging of Rev. P. McMenamy. While working with students as a director of the EMMS, Handyside realized that it could be beneficial to have a field location in which students could work with local residents.  To this end, he established the "Cowgate Medical Mission Dispensary" in an old whisky shop in Edinburgh, Scotland on 15 May 1858.  The dispensary was turned over to William Thomson. He transformed the dispensary into the "Edinburgh Medical Missionary Society’s Training Institution" on 18 November 1861.  The institute was located in one of the worst spots in the city of Edinburgh in order to serve those in dire need.  The institute coupled medical and missionary work into the future medical missionaries’ daily routines. The Livingston Memorial Medical Training Institute took the place of the Cowgate Medical Mission Dispensary on 25 January 1878.

The EMMS expanded from its UK headquarters to serve people in need in other countries.  Its members went on to found several dispensaries and institutions throughout the world.  The EMMS's overseas missionary work began in the Middle East and then spread to India and Malawi.  Each missionary operation was spearheaded by a primary doctor upon the urging of the EMMS.  Under the direction of the EMMS, Dr. Kaloost Vartan founded the Nazareth dispensary in 1861.  Later, the EMMS started a medical missionary dispensary in Damascus in 1885.   A larger hospital was formed under the name Queen Victoria in 1898.   In 1881, a colleague of Vartan, Dr. Colin Valentine, founded an Institution in Agra for doctor training.   In 1895, a graduate of the Edinburgh University, Dr. Neil MacVicar founded his own branch hospital at the Blantyre Mission in Malawi.

The EMMS in India

History of EMMS in India
A Scottish missionary doctor, Dr. Colin Valentine was sponsored by the EMMS to journey to India to provide aid in 1861.   There, he was faced with many regulations in place that provided obstacles for medical aid.  He helped men and women alike.  Through the Institution in Agra, he fortified the students’ studies that they were taking at the Government School of Agra.  Because this was successful, the students were provided with grants from the EMMS so that they could continue their work.  Their training proved to be instrumental in the success of Indian medical missionaries throughout the region. In 1884, the Institution in Agra expanded to provide scholarships to men and women alike who were interested in studying medicine at the institute.

Operations in India
The EMMS currently supports four Emmanuel Healthcare Association (EHA) projects in India: Madhipura, Fatehpur, Prem Jyoti and Delhi AIDS.   The EMMS also trains nurses and fundraise for the EHA hospitals.  The EHA is the largest Christian medical provider in India.  It has 20 hospitals and 30 projects throughout 11 states that spread from the North to the Northeast of India.

Broadwell Christian Hospital of Fatehpur
The EMMS provides the Broadwell Christian Hospital of Fatehpur with resources for staff accommodation and equipment for operating.   The hospital was founded in 1909 by Dr. Mary and Jemima Mackenzie of the Women's Union Missionary Society.   In 1973, the EHA adopted the hospital.  In 2003, the EMMS began a major sponsor of the hospital when it was in need of funding.  The major services offered are reproductive and child health, surgery, ophthalmology, pediatrics, and community health development.  In the past year, the hospital has seen over 10,000 patients and carried out 300 major surgeries.

The Madhipura Christian Hospital
The Madhipura Christian Hospital is located in the northeastern region of Bihar.  It began in 1953 as a dispensary founded by the Brethren in Christ Church.   Dr. George Paulus served as the first medical missionary.  The hospital now has 25 beds thanks to the work of Dr. Lowell Mann and Dr. Kreider.  In 1974, the hospital came under the direction of the EHA.  The EMMS was instrumental in helping the hospital recover from the 2008 flooding that occurred in the region that swamped the hospital with 5–6 feet of water.   The EMMS helped develop a new ward for the hospital with a specialized incubator for low birth weight babies that are frequent in the region.

The Prem Jyoti Hospital
The Prem Jyoti Hospital is located in the northeastern part of Jharkhand.  The health program began in 1996 and, since its registration as a hospital in 2006, has expanded to provide medical aid and education to 172 villages of the Malto people.   It is a Christ-centered hospital that helps the poor, underserved tribe of the Maltos.  The hospital relies on volunteer outreach and Malto converts to Christianity.  More than 60% of the full-time staff is Maltos.   The hospital seeks to teach and empower local people to educate their own communities.  With this aim, they teach school health classes and provide mosquito nets for areas affected by malaria. The EMMS has contributed funds for equipment and training of staff.  Through the use of EMMS funds, the hospital now can give in-patient medical care and has improved its operating room.

The Shalom Delhi AIDS
The Shalom Delhi AIDS program began in 2004 to serve the HIV/AIDS community in Delhi.   The program offers critical care and general education under the "H.O.P.E" banner.  The "H.O.P.E." program stands for homecare, orphans, prevention, and enabling churches. The most common illnesses that it treats are TB, diarrhoeal disease and Cryptococcal Meningitis.

The EMMS funded in part the critical care component of the Shalom Delhi AIDS program until 2011, but has committed to full funding of this component since 2012.   The critical care component is the treatment of HIV-infected individuals, affected patients, and others who are thought to have high-risk behavior.   With the EMMS's funding, the Shalom Delhi AIDS program has been able to care for more than 1300 newly registered HIV positive patients.   It has had more than 15,000 patients visit its out-patient department since 2005 and about 2,5000 patients have been admitted for inpatient treatment.  The Christian message of the EMMS has been valued by the project and has contributed to the holistic care that it seeks to provide to its patients and family members.

The EMMS in Nepal

History of EMMS in Nepal
Until 1951, Nepal forbid any foreigners from entering its country.  Although visitors were allowed to enter the country, they were forbidden from engaging in Christian religious ceremonies and from converting others.  Their punishment was jail and deportation.    However, the government of Nepal invited a group of Christians in 1954 to Nepal in order to build a hospital in Tansen and provide clinics in the Kathmandu Valley.   After missionaries were allowed to enter, on 5 March 1954, eight missions located in India created an interdenominational mission to provide aid.   This mission was called the United Mission to Nepal.  Scottish missionaries were instrumental in the success of the United Mission to Nepal, given their background in the region, helping Nepali migrants in the Northeastern region of India since the 1800s.

Operations in Nepal

International Nepal Fellowship (INF)’s Surkhet Programme (ISP)
The EMMS has supported the International Nepal Fellowship (INF)’s Surkhet Programme (ISP) over the past 10 years.   The INF is a Christian medical mission that works to provide medical services to the Nepali people and develop various healthcare initiatives in Nepal to combat TB, leprosy, HIV/AIDS, and other health dangers. The EMMS aided the INF's Surkhet clinic in transitioning toward providing a TB and a leprosy wing for its patients.   When the EMMS began its funding, the clinic had 30 beds to treat TB and leprosy cases.   In 2005, a split was initiated so that the ISP would focus on the leprosy cases and another INF program took responsibility for the TB treatment.   With the additional funds of the EMMS, the ISP was able to begin a community health initiative for expecting mothers.  Using the special funds portion of the EMMS's contributions, the ISP also opened a general hospital that served rural villagers.   According to the original plan, this hospital was later taken over by the government's health system.

With the EMMS's financial commitment, the ISP has specialized in pre- and post-natal care for mothers.   According to Alan Barker, the ISP Programme Support manager, there has been an increase in the visits of mothers to health facilities for pre- and post-natal care.   With the ISP available, mothers now give birth more frequently in the health clinic rather than at home without trained help.  The ISP has expanded three rural projects in neighboring villages to serve women who are generally underserved.  In order to reach these locations, the ISP received funds for a 4-wheel drive vehicle to transport field staff to remote locations.   The vehicle also enables the ISP to carry the patients and clients to and from the facilities.

The EMMS in Malawi

History of EMMS in Malawi
The EMMS began its mission to Malawi with the passage of one of its students, Neil MacVicar, to set up the Blantyre Mission in 1895.  MacVicar had grown up poor and subsisted in his studies through 5 shillings of unheated lodgings and five shillings a week for food.  Despite this great adversity, he graduated in 1893 as the top student at Edinburgh University, having received numerous medals.  In 1896, at the urging of the EMMS, he oversaw the construction of a brick building that served as the dispensary at Blantyre, Malawi.  He was charged with the responsibility to "‘serve the mission and the natives first, the European community only next.’" Once there, he began training Africans as assistants.  In so doing, he was the first European to provide such training in the region.  To supplement this training, he published a set of lectures that would enable an African assistant to carry out simple medical procedures, such as dressing wounds, without observation.  MacVicar and the doctors who followed him expressed their indebtedness to the nurses and assistants.  In fact, MacVicar wrote, "‘Perhaps the greatest practical development of the Victorian era, the development of modern nursing, without which neither surgery nor medicine could have achieved half their triumphs.’"  Later, the Blantyre missionary wrote, "We notice over and over again how much more readily [Africans] will submit to take choloroform, for instance, if administered by one of the boys [African assistants], and they too can coax patients when all our efforts are of no avail."  Nevertheless, these African assistants were not treated with the same respect as Europeans.    MacVicar acknowledged that "In a civilized country it would be a grave error to encourage men to practice Medicine and Surgery in a fractional kind of way," but that with such a limited number of doctors, it would be justified in an "uncivilized" country.
MacVicar designed the Blantyre Mission as a model of the British teaching hospital.  The hospital had two wards for African males and one ward for African women.  There were two beds for European patients.  There was more light in the hospital operating room than at other hospitals in the area.  This light served to improve the effectiveness of the doctors, but caused anxiety in the patients.  The African patients thought bad spirits could come through the windows.  It also contained a central heating system through an underground fire chamber.    MacVicar maintained detailed records of the treatments given at the hospital.     By 1905, the average hospital stay of patients at the Blantyre Mission was about half of what patients experienced at the UMCA hospital.   Moreover, MacVicar sought to have in-patient care so as to avoid forcing the patients to walk many miles to receive treatment each day.

Current projects in Malawi
The EMMS works with the Church of Central Africa Presbyterian (CCAP) and assists with five major projects: The Ekwendeni Hospital, the Ekwendeni College of Nursing, the Enukweni Maternity Unit, the David Gordon Memorial Hospital, and the Mulanje Mission Hospital.

The Ekwendeni Hospital
The Ekwendeni Hospital sees 21,000 out-patients annually, of which one-third are admitted.  It offers 183 beds and medical relief for an area of 45,000 with a larger referral area of 120,000 people.    The types of specialties that the hospital provides are nutrition, ophthalmology, dental surgery, and laboratory work.    The most commonly seen diseases are HIV, TB, and malaria.  To accommodate the TB cases, there is a 24-bed TB ward that serves these patients exclusively. In their lab, doctors and staff research and conduct 27,000 tests each year. The EMMS has focused on purchasing necessary equipment, constructing new space, and providing funds for the hospital staff and training.  The equipment that the EMMS has purchased includes a baby resuscitation equipment, a defibrillator, ECG machine, an anaesthetic machine, and an oxygen concentrator.   There are three nurseries that have the capability of serving premature babies.  It has also contributed to the construction of a cattle shed to provide food and income for the hospital's Orphan care Programme. The new operating theatre purchased by the EMMS has been hailed as vital by Enos Msowaya, the Senior Administrator of the hospital.  Msowaya writes, "The new operating theatre enabled us to treat 12% more patients and improve recovery rates."  The ortheoedic center is the second hospital in Malawi to be created.

The Ekwendeni College of Health Sciences at the University of Livingstonia
The EMMS also funds the Ekwendeni College of Health Sciences at the University of Livingstonia.   The university is one of only three universities in Malawi.  The health sciences college has 144 student nurses who study for a diploma as a nurse/midwife technician.   The EMMS has provided textbooks and funded a student hardship fund.   These funds have been crucial as the cost to educate, feed, and house students is $2000 per year, while the student can only fund individually about $800 on average.  The devaluation of the country's currency, the Malawi kwacha, makes it more likely that students will be in financial need for sponsorship.  With the EMMS's contributions, the college was able to construct a male student hostel and become the first college in Malawi to train male nurses.

The David Gordon Memorial Hospital – Livingstonia
The David Gordon Memorial Hospital (DGM) – Livingstonia is located in an isolated northern region of Malawi and was established in 1910.   With 100 beds, it serves 10,000 patients per year out of a population of 70,000.   One quarter of the patients seen are admitted.  The most common diseases treated are complications due to malaria, pneumonia, AIDS, and TB.  One-third of the operating budget of the hospital comes from outside donations, which include those from the EMMS.  The EMMS supports the DGM Hospital through such projects as building staff houses, training its staff, and buying nessary equipment.  This equipment has included an ultrasound scanner, a solar power unit, and a water supply purifier for the hospital facilities.  Through its financial support, the hospital has expanded its treatment capabilities to include four clinics in neighboring towns of Luwichi, Mlowe, Zunga, and Tcharo.

Enukweni HIV Testing & Counselling Center
The EMMS has funded the addition of a maternity facility to the Enukweni HIV Testing & Counselling Center.   The new wing of the center includes 8 beds for pre-natal and post-natal care, an advanced delivery room, and a neo-natal ICU.  The center offers rapid-response HIV testing, which takes 15–20 minutes to diagnose, for women who are interested in checking their HIV status.  The EMMS also funded the necessary primary components of the facilities such as toilets, showers, and the laundry machines.  The equipment in the facility was donated in part from the BBC Scotland channel that had extra maternity equipment from a TV series that was completed.  The maternity facility serves 200 pre-natal cases and 100 deliveries per month.

The Mulanje Mission Hospital
The EMMS funds one bed at the Mulanje Mission Hospital in the south of Malawi.   The hospital admits about 8,000 patients and delivers 2,500 babies each year.  There are 204 beds in total at the hospital.   The hospital's programs include environmental health, child healthcare, nutrition, and HIV & AIDS services.  The EMMS has raised funds to build staff accommodation, renovate the Isolation Ward, exchange bedding, and improve the Children's Ward. The EMMS was also instrumental in getting a grant of £137,000 from the Scottish Government International Development Fund to establish a community health program at the hospital.  Since its inception, the program has led to immunizations increasing by 43%, youth HIV decreasing by 6%, attendance at HIV treatment clinics increasing 340%, and HIV testing increasing by 360%.

The Tiyanjane clinic and the Umodzi Clinic
The EMMS also helps support the training of staff and volunteers at two clinics in Malawi: the Tiyanjane clinic and the Umodzi Clinic.   The Tiyanjane Clinic offers palliative care to people with HIV and AIDS who have been treated at the Queen Elizabeth Central Hospital (QECH).   An estimated 70% of the patients at the hospital have HIV.  The clinic offers care and counseling to help people continue living their lives without agony.   Pain is reported by 74% of the patients and 56% of patients require oral morphine.  In order to better serves these patients, the EMMS sponsored the first Palliative Care conference of Malawi at the clinic.  In addition to the care offered at the Tiyanjane Clinic, the Umodzi Clinic helps children who are HIV positive, have AIDS or have been diagnosed with cancer.   It serves cancer patients who are 14 years old or younger.  It provides group support to mothers and children.  There are approximately 80 children who regularly attend the daycare center where they play and eat nutritious meals.

Publications and publicity
According to John Wilkinson, "from the beginning, the [EMMS] was very publicity-conscious."  In its first year, the EMMS published the "Annual Report," which documents its history and activities. In order to further enhance the EMMS's publicity, the EMMS began to produce a quarterly journal called the "Occasional Paper" beginning in January, 1854.  It was distributed free of charge until October 1961 when it was no longer financially viable. In 1865, "The Medical Missionary Journal" was published concerning medical missionary news. In 1871, the EMMS began producing the "Quarterly Papers" that cost one pound annually, but was mailed without charge.  In 1966, the Annual Report and the Quarterly Papers were made into one journal called "The Healing Hand."
	
To supplement its publications, the EMMS also drew the interest of the general public through its monthly prayer and lecture series held at No. 57 George Square and other locations. These prayer meetings served to reinforce the Christian values of the society and to provide insight from first-hand experience from those who served abroad.

In addition to its formal publications, the EMMS maintains a website and blog to update readers on its accomplishments and to bring more support.   The blog posts regularly begin with calls for praise and requests for prayer in the work of the EMMS.  The blog quotes Biblical passages, such as Ephesians 6:12, to explain the EMMS's role as a Christian medical missionary organization .  Also, the EMMS produces an electronic booklet called, "Prayer Focus," that guides the reader through different prayers for the various locations of the EMMS's work.

Fundraising
Since 1992, the EMMS has been fundraising through bike rides in various countries.   The first bike ride that it sponsored took place in Israel with the Norwood Ravenswood Charity.  This bike ride took riders from Dan to Beersheba.  The EMMS believes that bike rides are one of the most opportune modes of fundraising because the participants can not only see the locations which will benefit from their fundraising, but also will have a "real challenge [to] the mind and body and [have] an unforgettable spiritual experience." The EMMS believes that supporters will see the value of their contributions by visiting these site locations and seeing the effect of their funding efforts.  The EMMS tells its potential visitors that the bike treks are not a "holiday" and are actually very challenging.  In addition to the bike rides, the EMMS suggests that anyone who wishes to donate can join a fundraiser that other organizations lead.  These "open challenges" come from organizations that the EMMS lists on its website that include Classic Tours, Discover Adventure, Travel2Give, and Different Travel.

The EMMS requires participants to raise a certain number of pounds for each bike ride.  For example, for the 2013 "Cycle Malawi" bike ride, participants must raise at least 2,950 in order to join the trip.   To ensure the safety of the riders, the EMMS requires them to get the proper vaccinations and health screenings needed for each region that they will visit.

In the past, the EMMS International did not limit its fundraising to only its own organization, but also helped fundraise for the Nazareth Trust until 2009.   In 2001 the EMMS split into two organizations: the EMMS International and the Nazareth Trust.  However, the EMMS International continued to support the Nazareth Trust through its bike rides until 2009. The EMMS raised £340,000 since the split to fund the Nazareth Trust and help in its nurse training operations.
The EMMS does not limit itself to fundraising through bikerides, but also allows for other means of donation. These donations can come in the form of stocks, stamps, wills, or direct funds.   Stamp donations provide a unique means of raising funds of the EMMS. The EMMS will accept stamps from the UK and older stamps from other locations.  Direct donations can be offered in the amounts of 10, 20, 50, 100, or whatever amount the giver chooses. It can be given as a one-time donation or on a monthly schedule.

Structure
The board of trustees is the body that organizes the future planning of the organization and oversees the accountability of the charity. With the board's agenda in place, the CEO is responsible for the day-to-day operations and success of the steps.  The board and the CEO cooperate with each other to advance overarching strategy and budgets to meet the organization's goals. The board has several meetings throughout the year. There are between four and twenty board members at any given time. Trustees are selected by an appointment process and serve as trustees for periods of three years.  After each three-year period, a trustee must undergo the re-election process.  A trustee can spend a maximum of nine consecutive years as a trustee before he or she must take a gap of a year before going through the election process again.

The board of trustees is broken down into sub-committees that are ongoing or time-limited to certain projects. There is one current sub-committee, the Finance, Audit and Investment Committee. This committee oversees the budgets and expenses.  It looks through proposals for expenditures and participates in the annual auditing process at the end of the year. The Investment Fund managers are responsible for the management of funds and are kept for a five-year period after which they must undergo a review by the Finance subcommittee.
	
The EMMS seeks to maintain the highest professional and ethical integrity.  It is a member of the Fundraising Standards Board and has implemented the Finance Institute's Donors’ Charter and Code of Conduct.   It invests in stocks, funds, shares, securities, and other investments. However, it does "not knowingly [make] investments in companies which, to any significant degree, manufacture, or deal in, armaments, alcoholic beverages, gambling, pornography, or tobacco."

Financial information
The EMMS provides detailed information in regards to its financial status and the source of its funding within its brochures and on its website.  For instance, from 2009 to 2010, the EMMS increased its income from £850,413 to £1,151,989.  In its 2010 brochure, it outlines the various sources of income and compares these amounts to the previous year. A chart is provided below to show the development of income  and expenditures from the years 2009 to 2010.

Income

Expenditures

References

External links

 

Foreign charities operating in Malawi
Medical missions
Christian medical missionaries
Foreign charities operating in India
Foreign charities operating in Nepal
Foreign charities operating in the State of Palestine
Charities based in Edinburgh